The Martyrs of Ebsdorf were a group of Catholic martyrs killed in the winter of 880 AD at the Battle of Lüneburg Heath near Ebstorf, Saxony. Their feast day is February 2.

Recognised martyrs 
The Martyrs consisted of four bishops, 11 noblemen, and numerous unknown foot soldiers. Recognised members include Bruno of Saxony, Saints Marquard of Hildesheim and Theodorich of Minden. Some Synaxarions, however, contain a list of 32 Saints:Bishops
 Marquard, bishop of Hildesheim;
 Gobbert, bishop of Osnabrück;
 Erlulf, bishop of Verden;
 Dietrich (or Theodorich, Theodorik, Theodoricus), bishop of Minden;
Knights 
 Wigmann
 Bardo (3x)
 Thioterik (2x)
 Gerrich
 Liudolf
 Folkward
 Avan
Noblemen
 Liuthar (or Lothar), Count of Stade
 Bruno, Duke of Saxony
 Adelram
 Alfuïnus
 Addesta
 Aida (or Edi, 2x)
 Dodo
 Bodo (or Botho)
 Wal
 Halif
 Humilduïnus
 Adalwin
 Werinhart
 Theodorich
 Hildewart
 Bardolf
 Hivart
The martyrs were slain while fighting Norsemen of the Great Heathen Army who had recently been repelled from England at the Battle of Edington.

References

Year of birth unknown
880 deaths
Date of birth unknown

9th-century Saxon people
Groups of Christian martyrs of the Middle Ages